Mirka Cabrera (born 10 September 1994) is an Ecuadorian model and beauty pageant titleholder who was crowned Miss Ecuador and competed at Miss World 2016.

Pageantry

She was elected Reina de Puerto Bolívar 2009. In 2014, she won Reina de la Minería and Reina de Machala. Also, in the same year, she competed at Reina Mundial del Banano Ecuador where she was the 1st Runner-up.

In 2015, Cabrera competed at Miss Ecuador where she was unplaced, and in 2016, she competed at Miss World Ecuador where she was elected the winner, at the end of the evening.

Miss World 2016
As the winner of Miss World Ecuador 2016, Cabrera represented Ecuador at Miss World 2016 that was held in the United States. She was in the top 21 in talent competition, but she failed to place in the final top at the coronation event where Stephanie Del Valle won the crown.

References

External links 
Official Miss World Ecuador website

1994 births
Living people
Ecuadorian female models
Ecuadorian beauty pageant winners
Miss World Ecuador
Miss World 2016 delegates
21st-century Ecuadorian women